Furnari is a surname. Notable people with the surname include:

Christopher Furnari (1924–2018), American mobster
Eva Furnari (born 1948), Italian–Brazilian author and illustrator
Garry Furnari (born 1954), American judge and politician

See also
Funari